Swedenhielms is a 1935 Swedish comedy-drama film directed by Gustaf Molander. The film is based on the play by Hjalmar Bergman from 1923 and starrs Gösta Ekman, Karin Swanström, and Tutta Rolf.

Plot
The Swedenhielm family is an old proud nobility family. The head is the old physics professor Rolf Swedenhielm. His three children also live with him: Bo, Julia and Rolf Jr., as well as the hearty housekeeper Boman. The family is on the verge of bankruptcy and the only hope is that the professor is awarded the Nobel Prize.

Cast
 Gösta Ekman as Professor Rolf Swedenhielm, engineer and inventor 
 Björn Berglund as Rolf Swedenhielm Jr, engineer
 Håkan Westergren as Bo Swedenhielm, air Lt.
 Tutta Rolf as Julia Swedenhielm, actress
 Ingrid Bergman as Astrid, Bo Swedenhielm's fiancée
 Sigurd Wallén as Erik Erikson, usurer 
 Karin Swanström as Marta Boman, housekeeper
 Nils Ericson as Pedersén, journalist 
 Mona Geijer-Falkner as cleaning woman

References

External links

 
 
 

1935 films
1930s Swedish-language films
Swedish black-and-white films
Swedish comedy-drama films
1935 comedy-drama films
Films directed by Gustaf Molander
1930s Swedish films